Czarna  is a village in Dębica County, Subcarpathian Voivodeship, in south-eastern Poland. It is the seat of the gmina (administrative district) called Gmina Czarna.

The village has a population of 2,474.

References

Villages in Dębica County